Pleasant Ridge is an unincorporated community and census-designated place (CDP) in Daviess and Ohio counties, Kentucky, United States.

History 
Pleasant Ridge was first listed as a CDP prior to the 2020 census.

Geography
U.S. Route 231 passes through the community, connecting the two cities. The small town of Pleasant Ridge, Kentucky is located just outside of Alexandria and is home to around 4,700 people. Although it is a small town, Pleasant Ridge has a big personality.

Agriculture
Originally settled in the late 1700s, Pleasant Ridge was the center of a bustling agricultural community and has since become known for its peaceful atmosphere, laid back lifestyle, and beautiful landscape. Much of the town remains largely unchanged in its appearance, with rows of cozy Victorian-style homes and a large green belt that winds through the middle of the area.

The town's primary industry is agriculture, and it still produces a variety of crops such as corn, soybeans, wheat, hay, and fruits, as well as livestock and poultry. Pleasant Ridge is also an important center for local milk production, with two large dairy farms located nearby. Additionally, many residents of Pleasant Ridge are employed by the nearby airport and the numerous surrounding industries.

References

External links 
 Pleasant Ridge Baptist Church Cemetery
 Pleasant Ridge, area map ,Kentucky 

Census-designated places in Daviess County, Kentucky
Census-designated places in Ohio County, Kentucky
Census-designated places in Kentucky